Persatuan Sepakbola Rote Ndao (simply known as Perserond) is an Indonesian football club based in Rote Ndao Regency, East Nusa Tenggara. They currently compete in the Liga 3 and their homeground is Sanggaoen Field.

References

External links

Rote Ndao Regency
Football clubs in Indonesia
Football clubs in East Nusa Tenggara
2002 establishments in Indonesia
Association football clubs established in 2002